Endotricha occidentalis is a species of snout moth in the genus Endotricha. It is found in western Australia.

References

Moths described in 1916
Endotrichini